Pennsboro is a city in Ritchie County, West Virginia, United States. The population was 1,050 at the 2020 census.  The city is located at the junction of U.S. Route 50 and West Virginia Route 74; the North Bend Rail Trail also passes through the city.

The town was platted circa 1820 by Charles Penn, and named for him.

Geography
Pennsboro is located at  (39.283528, -80.967097).

Demographics

2010 census
At the 2010 census there were 1,171 people, 522 households, and 312 families living in the city. The racial makeup of the city was 97.9% White, 0.3% African American, 0.5% Native American, 0.1% Asian, 0.4% from other races, and 0.9% from two or more races. Hispanic or Latino of any race were 1.0%.

Of the 522 households 27.0% had children under the age of 18 living with them, 41.6% were married couples living together, 14.0% had a female householder with no husband present, 4.2% had a male householder with no wife present, and 40.2% were non-families. 34.5% of households were one person and 14.1% were one person aged 65 or older. The average household size was 2.24 and the average family size was 2.85.

The median age was 41.7 years. 21.7% of residents were under the age of 18; 8% were between the ages of 18 and 24; 24.8% were from 25 to 44; 28.5% were from 45 to 64; and 16.9% were 65 or older. The gender makeup of the city was 46.9% male and 53.1% female.

2000 census
At the 2000 census there were 1,199 people, 515 households, and 340 families living in the city. The population density was 550.8 people per square mile (212.4/km). There were 604 housing units at an average density of 277.5 per square mile (107.0/km).  The racial makeup of the city was 98.67% White, 0.25% African American, 0.42% Native American, and 0.67% from two or more races. Hispanic or Latino of any race were 0.75%.

Of the 515 households 28.5% had children under the age of 18 living with them, 51.5% were married couples living together, 10.9% had a female householder with no husband present, and 33.8% were non-families. 30.3% of households were one person and 16.3% were one person aged 65 or older. The average household size was 2.33 and the average family size was 2.89.

The age distribution was 22.9% under the age of 18, 7.8% from 18 to 24, 26.5% from 25 to 44, 25.9% from 45 to 64, and 16.9% 65 or older. The median age was 40 years. For every 100 females, there were 92.1 males. For every 100 females age 18 and over, there were 88.8 males.

The median household income was $24,120 and the median family income was $30,313. Males had a median income of $26,964 versus $20,714 for females. The per capita income for the city was $14,325. About 16.5% of families and 21.4% of the population were below the poverty line, including 33.1% of those under age 18 and 10.2% of those age 65 or over.

References

Cities in West Virginia
Cities in Ritchie County, West Virginia
Northwestern Turnpike